Lawn bowls at the 1972 Summer Paralympics consisted of four events.

Medal summary

References 

 

1972 Summer Paralympics events
1972
Paralympics